The 1932 Iowa State Cyclones football team represented Iowa State College of Agricultural and Mechanic Arts (later renamed Iowa State University) in the Big Six Conference during the 1932 college football season. In their second season under head coach George F. Veenker, the Cyclones compiled a 3–4–1 record (0–4–1 against conference opponents), finished in last place in the conference, and outscored their opponents by a combined total of 105 to 101. They played their home games at State Field in Ames, Iowa.

Dick Grefe was the team captain. No Iowa State player was selected as a first-team all-conference player.

Schedule

References

Iowa State
Iowa State Cyclones football seasons
Iowa State Cyclones football